The Biggest Bang is a four-disc concert DVD collection released by the Rolling Stones. The collection documents several shows from the band's 2005–2006 legs of their A Bigger Bang Tour. The DVD debuted at number one on Billboards music video chart, selling 20,422 copies during the first week, and had sold almost 48,000 copies by mid-September 2007. By 2012 it was certified seven times multi-platinum in the United States for shipments of some 175,000 units. It was re-released on Blu-ray on 16 June 2009, with only the concert of Austin and accompanying mini-documentary, the Salt of the Earth tour documentary, and the excerpt of the Saitama concert.

Track listing

Disc 1: Zilker Park, Austin, Texas – 22 October 2006 
 Opening (intro)
 "You Got Me Rocking"
 "Let's Spend the Night Together"
 "She's So Cold"
 "Oh No, Not You Again"
 "Sway"
 "Bob Wills Is Still the King"
 "Streets of Love"
 "Ain't Too Proud to Beg"
 "Tumbling Dice"
 "Learning the Game"
 "Little T&A"
 "Under My Thumb"
 "Get Off of My Cloud"
 "Honky Tonk Women"
 "Sympathy for the Devil"
 "Jumpin' Jack Flash"
 "(I Can't Get No) Satisfaction"
 "Brown Sugar"

Bonus features 
 "Austin Mini-Documentary"
 ""I Can't Be Satisfied" from Milan, Italy
 "Jukebox Feature"

Disc 2: Copacabana Beach, Rio de Janeiro, Brazil – 18 February 2006 
 Opening (intro)
 "Jumpin' Jack Flash"
 "It's Only Rock 'n Roll (But I Like It)"
 "You Got Me Rocking"
 "Wild Horses"
 "Rain Fall Down"
 "Midnight Rambler"
 "The Night Time (Is The Right Time)"
 "Happy"
 "Miss You"
 "Rough Justice"
 "Get Off of My Cloud"
 "Honky Tonk Women"
 "Start Me Up"
 "Brown Sugar"
 "You Can't Always Get What You Want"
 "(I Can't Get No) Satisfaction"

Bonus feature 
 Rio de Janeiro documentary

Disc 3: Rest of the World

Saitama Super Arena, Saitama, Japan – 2 April 2006 
 Opening (intro)
 "Let's Spend the Night Together"  Sapporo (segue)
 "Rain Fall Down"  Tokyo Dome (segue)
 "Rough Justice"  Cherry Blossoms (segue)

Shanghai Grand Stage, Shanghai, China – 8 April 2006 
 Opening (intro)
 "Bitch"
 "Midnight Rambler"
 "Gimme Shelter"
 "This Place Is Empty"  That's What I Do (segue)
 "It's Only Rock 'n' Roll (but I Like It)"  China, A Slow Process (segue)

River Plate Stadium, Buenos Aires, Argentina – 21 February and/or 23, 2006 
 Opening (intro)
 "Worried About You"  Football Chant (segue)
 "Happy"
 "Miss You"  Ronnie & Audience (segue)
 "Paint It Black"
 "(I Can't Get No) Satisfaction"

Featurettes 
 Bonnie Raitt featurette "Shine a Light"
 Eddie Vedder featurette "Wild Horses"
 Dave Matthews featurette "Let It Bleed"

Duets 
 "Shine a Light" featuring Bonnie Raitt
 "Wild Horses" featuring Eddie Vedder
 "Let It Bleed" featuring Dave Matthews
 "Wild Horses" featuring Cui Jian
 "Jukebox Feature"

Disc 4 
 "Salt of the Earth: A Bigger Bang Tour Documentary"

Bonus songs 
 "Get Up, Stand Up"
 "Mr. Pitiful"

Bonus features 
 "If It Ain't Got That Swing" featuring Charlie Watts
 "Hurricane" featuring Keith Richards
 "Outlets of Emotion" featuring Ron Wood
 "Busking" featuring Mick Jagger

Charts and certifications

Weekly charts

Certifications

Year-end charts

References 

The Rolling Stones video albums
The Rolling Stones documentary films
Films directed by Hamish Hamilton (director)